In evolutionary psychology and behavioral ecology, human mating strategies are a set of behaviors used by individuals to select, attract, and retain mates. Mating strategies overlap with reproductive strategies, which encompass a broader set of behaviors involving the timing of reproduction and the trade-off between quantity and quality of offspring.

Relative to those of other animals, human mating strategies are unique in their relationship with cultural variables such as the institution of marriage. Humans may seek out individuals with the intention of forming a long-term intimate relationship, marriage, casual relationship, or friendship. The human desire for companionship is one of the strongest human drives. It is an innate feature of human nature and may be related to the sex drive. The human mating process encompasses the social and cultural processes whereby one person may meet another to assess suitability, the courtship process and the process of forming an interpersonal relationship. Commonalities, however, can be found between humans and nonhuman animals in mating behavior, as in the case of  animal sexual behavior in general and assortative mating in particular.

Theoretical background

Parental investment 

Research on human mating strategies is guided by the theory of sexual selection, and in particular, Robert Trivers' concept of parental investment. Trivers defined parental investment as "any investment by the parent in an individual offspring that increases the offspring's chance of surviving (and hence reproductive success) at the cost of the parent's ability to invest in other offspring." The support given to each offspring typically differs between the father and mother. Trivers posited that it is the differential parental investment between males and females that drives the process of sexual selection. In turn, sexual selection leads to the evolution of sexual dimorphism in mate choice, competitive ability, and courtship displays (see secondary sex characteristics).

Minimum parental investment is the least required care for successful reproduction. In humans, females have a higher minimum parental investment. They have to invest in internal fertilization, placentation, and gestation, followed by childbirth and lactation. However, males do not have to invest as much, but many males contribute high investment to their offspring. While human males can invest heavily in their offspring as well, their minimum parental investment is still lower than that of females. Whereas females have to at least invest in pregnancy, the minimum parental investment of a male is his sperm cells.

This same concept can be looked at from an economic perspective regarding the costs of engaging in sexual relations. Females incur the higher costs, as they carry the possibility of becoming pregnant among other costs. Conversely, males have comparatively minimal costs of having a sexual encounter. Therefore, evolutionary psychologists have predicted a number of sex differences in human mating psychologies.

Women tend to appreciate men who are chivalrous even if they might be patriarchal towards them. Furthermore, they are likely to be more dependent on such men, to limit their own ambitions, and to submit to them. Because such men are more likely to invest in these women and their children, it makes evolutionary sense for women to be drawn towards them.

Life history strategies 

Life history theory helps to explain differences in timing of sexual relationships, quantity of sexual partners, and parental investment. According to this theory, organisms have a limited supply of energy, which they use to develop their bodies. This energy is put on a theoretical spectrum of how organisms prioritize energy use. At one end of the spectrum, the organism prioritizes speeding up physical development and reaching sexual maturation quickly, which is deemed a fast strategy. Additionally, fast strategy organisms seek to have sexual relationships earlier, several mates, and invest little in their offspring. On the other end of the spectrum, is slow strategy, where the organism prioritizes development of a high quality body. Slow strategy organisms seek to have sexual relationships later, few mates, and invest more heavily in their offspring.

These strategies are unconscious and help increase the organism's reproductive success in a given environment. Early childhood environments dictate which strategy a person unconsciously pursues. In a hostile environment, risks and unpredictability are increased and therefore survival is less likely than in safe environments. A fast strategy is more likely to be pursued by an organism in a hostile environment in order to reach maturity and reproduce quickly. In safe environments, an organism is likely to pursue a slow strategy to develop its body first and then reproduce. Each strategy is optimized for their specific environmental characteristics. Therefore, the life history strategy influences the mating strategy of the individual animal. This concept has been applied to humans as well. Additionally, there are differences in life history strategies both between and within species.

Sex similarities

Assortative mating

Human mating is inherently non-random. Despite the common trope "opposites attract," humans generally prefer mates who share the same or similar traits, such as genetics, quantitative phenotypes like height or body-mass index, skin pigmentation, the level of physical attractiveness, disease risk (including cancers and mental disorders), race or ethnicity, facial features, socioeconomic factors (such as (potential) income level and occupational prestige), cultural backgrounds, moral values, religious beliefs, political orientation, (perceived) personality traits (such as conscientiousness or extraversion), behavioral characteristics (such as the level of generosity or the propensity for alcoholism), educational attainment, and IQ or general intelligence. Moreover, whereas in the past marriage across status lines was more common — in  the sense that the woman typically looked for a man of high status (hypergamy), a sign of access to resources, while the man was usually willing to marry down the socioeconomic ladder (hypogamy) if the woman had good domestic skills, was young and good-looking (all proxies of fertility) —, in the modern world, people tend to desire well-educated and intelligent children; this goal is better achieved by marrying bright people with high incomes, resulting in the intensification of economic assortative mating. Indeed, better educated parents tend to have children who are not only well-educated but also healthy and successful. Furthermore, the age gap between two partners has also declined. In other words, men and women became more symmetrical in the socioeconomic traits they desire in a mate. Among the aforementioned traits, the correlations in age, race or ethnicity, religion, educational attainment, and intelligence between spouses are the most pronounced, while height is one of the most heritable, with mating partners sharing 89% of the genetic variations affecting the preference for height.

Public secondary school is the last time people of various backgrounds are lumped together in the same setting. After that, they begin sorting themselves out by various measures of social screening. Among those marrying late (relative to the time when they left school), socioeconomic status is especially important. In societies where the numbers of highly educated and career-minded women are increasing, the role of socioeconomic status is likely to be even more important in the future. These women generally do not want to accept as mates men who are less occupationally and educationally accomplished than they are. For this reason, in societies where they outnumber men, the competition for high-quality males has been intensifying. This trend first emerged in Europe and North America but has been spreading to other places as well.

Positive assortative mating raises the chances of a given trait being passed on to the couple's offspring, strengthens the bond between the parents, and increases genetic similarity between family members, whereupon in-group altruism and inclusive fitness are enhanced. That the two partners are culturally compatible reduces uncertainty in lifestyle choices and ensures social support. In some cases, homogamy can also increase the couple's fertility and the number of offspring surviving till adulthood. On the other hand, there is evolutionary pressure against mating with people too genetically similar to oneself, such as members of the same nuclear family. In addition, children born into parents who are cousins have an increased risk of autosomal recessive genetic disorders, and this risk is higher in populations that are already highly ethnically homogeneous. Children of more distantly related cousins have less risk of these disorders, though still higher than the average population.Therefore, humans tend to maximize the genetic similarity of their mates while avoiding excessive inbreeding or incest. First-cousin marriages nowadays are rare and are in fact prohibited in a number of jurisdictions worldwide. In general, humans seem to prefer mates who are (the equivalent of) second or higher-parity cousins. Genetic analyses suggest that the genomic correlation between spouses is comparable to that between second cousins. In the past, there was indeed some awareness of the dangers of inbreeding, as can be seen in legal prohibitions in some societies, while the current era, better transportation infrastructure makes it less likely to occur. Moreover, modern transportation has diminished residential propinquity as a factor in assortative mating. But cultural anthropologists have noted that avoidance of inbreeding cannot be the sole basis for the incest taboo because the boundaries of the incest prohibition vary widely between cultures, and not necessarily in ways that maximize the avoidance of inbreeding. A study indicated that between 1800 and 1965 in Iceland, more children and grandchildren were produced from marriages between third or fourth cousins (people with common great-great- or great-great-great-grandparents) than from other degrees of consanguinity.

While human assortative mating is usually positive, in the case of the major histocompatibility complex (MHC) on chromosome 6, humans tend to be more attracted to those who are genetically different in this region, judging from their odors. This promotes MHC heterogeneity in their offspring, making them more resistant to pathogens.

Assortative mating is partly due to social effects. For instance, religious people are more likely to meet their potential mates in their places of worship while highly educated people typically meet their future spouses in institutions of higher learning. Nevertheless, it can have a quantitatively discernible impact upon the human genome and as such has implications for human evolution even in the presence of population stratification. Pleiotropy, or the phenomenon in which a single gene can influence multiple traits, and assortative mating are responsible for the correlations between some sexually selected traits in humans, such as height and IQ, which are weakly positively correlated. In a knowledge-based economy, educational and socioeconomic assortative mating contributes to the growth in household income inequality, as parents with higher incomes and levels of education tend to invest more in their offspring, giving them an edge later in life.

Dating

People date to assess each other's suitability as a partner in an intimate relationship or as a spouse. Dating rules may vary across different cultures, and some societies may even replace the dating process by a courtship instead.

Flirting

To bond or express sexual interest, people flirt. Social anthropologist Kate Fox posits two main types of flirting: flirting for fun and flirting with intent. Flirting for fun can take place between friends, co-workers, or total strangers who wish to get to know each other. This type of flirting does not seek sexual intercourse or romantic relationship, but increases the bonds between two people.

Flirting with intent plays a role in mate-selection. The person flirting sends out signals of sexual availability to another, and hopes to see the interest returned to encourage continued flirting. Flirting can involve non-verbal signs, such as an exchange of glances, hand-touching, hair-touching, or verbal signs, such as chatting up, flattering comments, and exchange of telephone numbers to enable further contact.

Matchmaking

In many cultural traditions, a date may be arranged by a third party, who may be a family member, acquaintance, or professional matchmaker. In some cultures, a marriage may be arranged by the couple's parents or an outside party. In some cultures, such as India, arranged marriages are common while in others, such as the United States, it is deemed unacceptable. From the 2000s onwards, internet dating—a new form of matchmaking—has become popular.

Double standards and infidelity 

Both men and women apply one set of standards for themselves and another for their partners. In particular, what counts as sexual contact is different depending on the person engaging in the act, oneself or one's partner. If the person in question is the one to do it, he or she is unlikely to consider it infidelity compared to when his or her partner does it. Nevertheless, women are more likely than men to be judged harshly for their promiscuity, even in the most gender-egalitarian of modern societies like Norway. In fact, women are the most aggressive in shaming other women for being promiscuous.

Sex differences

Short-term and long-term mating 
Due to differential parental investment, the less investing sex should display more intrasexual competitiveness. This is because they can invest less in each offspring and therefore can reproduce at a higher frequency, which allows them to compete for more mates. Additionally, the higher investing sex should be more choosy in their mate.  Since they have a higher minimum parental investment, they carry greater costs with each sexual encounter. These costs lead them to have higher selection standards and therefore they are more choosy.

In humans, females have the higher obligatory biological parental investment. In short-term mating, females are choosier as they have the bigger parental investment. In long-term mating, males and females are equally choosy as they have the same amount of parental investment. Therefore, female and male intrasexual competition and female and male choosiness is equally high in long-term mating but not in short-term mating.

Since males have the lower obligatory parental investment, they should pursue a short-term mating strategy more often than females. Short term mating is characterized by casual, low commitment sexual relationships with many partners that do not last a long time. Additionally, males benefit more from short-term mating than females do. Because males generally pursue short-term mating strategies, their overall reproductive success is higher than that of females, however it is also more variable. This means that males are able to have more offspring on average, however only relatively few males are able to have a very large number of offspring. Due to this short-mating strategy, males have a greater desire for sexual variety, need less time to consent to intercourse, and seek short-term mates more than females.

However, females also pursue short-term mates, but the motivations differ from males. Females can benefit from short-term mating in numerous ways. First, it allows for a quick extraction of resources. Women in a stressed situation may benefit from protection from a male and short term mating is a way to achieve this as is seen in contemporary asylum seeker anthropological studies. Additionally, they mate with a high mate value male that they would not be able to if they pursued a long-term strategy. This allows them to get access to higher quality genes.

One prominent hypothesis is that ancestral women selectively engaged in short-term mating with men capable of transmitting genetic benefits to their offspring such as health, disease resistance, or attractiveness (see good genes theory and sexy son hypothesis). Since women cannot inspect men's genes directly, they may have evolved to infer genetic quality from certain observable characteristics (see indicator traits). One prominent candidate for a "good genes" indicator includes fluctuating asymmetry, or the degree to which men deviate from perfect bodily symmetry. Other candidates include masculine facial features, behavioral dominance, and low vocal pitch.  Evolutionary psychologists have therefore indicated that women pursuing a short-term mating strategy have higher preferences for these good gene indicators, and men who possess good genes indicators are more successful in pursuing short-term mating strategies than men who do not. Indeed, research indicates that self-perceived physical attractiveness, fluctuating asymmetry, and low vocal pitch are positively related to short-term mating success in men but not in women. 

Conversely, long-term mating is marked by serious committed sexual relationships with relatively few partners. While males generally pursue a short-term mating strategy when possible, females typically pursue a long-term mating strategy. Long-term strategies are characterized by extended courtships, high investment, and few sexual partners. While pursuing a long-term strategy, females are able to get resources from males over the course of the relationship. Female mating psychology is generally more focused on finding high quality mates rather than increasing the quantity of their mates, which is reflected in their pursuit of a long-term strategy. Additionally, they also benefit from higher parental investment by males. Women are thought to seek long-term partners with resources (such as shelter and food) that provide aid and support survival of offspring. To achieve this, women are thought to have evolved extended sexuality. The key benefit for males pursuing a long-term strategy is higher parental certainty. However, both sexes pursue both strategies and get benefits from both strategies. Additionally, humans typically do not pursue the extremes of either short or long-term mating strategies.

It is possible that females are more prone to psychological depression than males if they are subject to K-selection. Because women's reproductive decisions are made with more risks then men's, postpartum depression could be a signal to women that they faced a bad investment opportunity, would be evolutionarily adaptive. By the same token, some researchers hypothesized that postpartum depression is more likely to occur in mothers who are suffering a fitness cost, in order to inform them that they should reduce or withdraw investment in their infants. Moreover, there is some evidence that postpartum depression could function as a bargaining strategy, in which parents who were not receiving adequate support from their partners withdrew their investment in order to elicit additional support. In support of this, Hagen found that postpartum depression in one spouse was related to increased levels of child investment in the other spouse.

Mate value 

Mate values correspond to future reproductive success likelihood of an individual. Mate value contains the ability of the individual to produce healthy offspring in the future, based on the individual's age and sex. The mate value of each sex is determined by what the opposite sex desires in a mate, so male mate values is determined by what females desire and vice versa. Over time, the individuals who had higher mate values had higher reproductive success. These qualities that make up mate value evolved into what is considered physically attractive. Thus individuals with a high mate value are perceived to be more attractive by the opposite sex than those with low mate value. Additionally, individuals with a high mate value are more able to be more choosy in their mates and reproduce more often than those with a low mate value. Due to biological differences between the sexes, it is predicted that there are differences in what the sexes desire in a mate. Therefore, it is thought that there are differences between male and female mate values.

Mate value is perceived through signals and cues. Signals are characteristics that have been selected for because they offer reliable changes in receiver behavior that lead to higher reproductive success for the receiver. Conversely, cues have not been selected for to carry meaning, instead they are byproducts. However, with sexual selection, cues can become signals over time. Costly signals are ones that require intense effort for the signaler to send. Because they require high investment, costly signals are typically honest signals of underlying genetic qualities. However, signals that are not costly enough can be faked and therefore are not associated with the underlying benefits.

Evolutionary psychologists have predicted that men generally place a greater value on youth and physical attractiveness in a mate than do women. Youth is associated with reproductive value in women, because their ability to have offspring decrease dramatically over time compared to men. Therefore, males typically prefer to mate with females who are younger than themselves, except when they are maturing in their teens. The features that men find physically attractive in women are thought to signal health and fertility. Additionally, physical attractiveness signals genetic quality for both males and females. Men who preferentially mated with healthy, fertile, and reproductively valuable women would have left more descendants than men who did not. Since men's reproductive value does not decline as steeply with age as does women's, women are not expected to exhibit as strong of a preference for youth in a mate.

However, male mate value is partly based upon his ability to acquire resources. This is because one of the costs of pregnancy is the limited ability to get resources for oneself. Additionally, it signals ability of the male to commit and invest in the female and her offspring. Male resource investment increases the likelihood the offspring will survive and reproduce itself. Due to this, females are typically attracted to older males, since they are likely to have a greater ability to provide resources and have a higher social status. Evolutionary psychologists have speculated that women are relatively more attracted to ambition and social status in a mate because they associate these characteristics with men's access to resources. Women who preferentially mated with men capable of investing resources in themselves and their offspring, thereby ensuring their offspring's survival, would have left more descendants than women who did not. Male mate value is also determined by his physical and social dominance, which are signals to high quality genes.

Sexual desire 
Sexual selection theory states that because of their lower minimum parental investment, men can achieve greater reproductive success by mating with multiple women than women can achieve by mating with multiple men. Evolutionary psychologists therefore argue that ancestral men who possessed a desire for multiple short-term sex partners, to the extent that they were capable of attracting them, would have left more descendants than men without such a desire. Ancestral women, by contrast, would have maximized reproductive success not by mating with as many men as possible, but by selectively mating with those men who were most able and willing to invest resources in their offspring. Gradually in a bid to compete to get resources from potential men, women have evolved to show extended sexuality.

One classic study of college students at Florida State University found that among 96 subjects chosen for attractiveness, approached on campus by opposite-sex confederates and asked if they wanted to "go to bed" with him/her, 75% of the men said yes while 0% percent of the women said yes. Evidence also indicates that, across cultures, men report a greater openness to casual sex, a larger desired number of sexual partners, and a greater desire to have sex sooner in a relationship. These sex differences have been shown to be reliable across various studies and methodologies. However, there is some controversy as to the scope and interpretation of these sex differences.

Evolutionary research often indicates that men have a strong desire for casual sex, unlike women. Men are often depicted as wanting numerous female sexual partners to maximize reproductive success. Evolutionary mechanisms for short-term mating are evident today. Mate-guarding behaviors and sexual jealousy point to an evolutionary history in which sexual relations with multiple partners became a recurrent adaptive problem, while the willingness of modern-day men to have sex with attractive strangers, and the prevalence of extramarital affairs in similar frequencies cross-culturally, are evidence of an ancestral past in which polygamous mating strategies were adopted.

Flanagan and Cardwell argue that men could not pursue this ideology without willing female partners. Every time a man has a new sexual partner, the woman also has a new sexual partner. It has been proposed, therefore, that casual sex and numerous sexual partners may also confer some benefit to females. That is, they would produce more genetically diverse offspring as a result, which would increase their chances of successfully rearing children to adolescence, or independence.

Error management theory states that psychological processes should be biased to minimize costs of making incorrect judgments and decisions. Since males generally pursue a short-term mating strategy, the costs of not having sexual intercourse is higher than having sexual intercourse. Therefore, the cost for a male thinking a female does not desire to engage in sexual intercourse when in fact she does is higher than perceiving a female does want to have sexual intercourse when she actually does not. Conversely, since females generally pursue a long-term strategy, the costs of having sexual intercourse is higher than not having sexual intercourse. Therefore, the cost for a female of perceiving a male wants to invest when he does not is higher than perceiving a male does not want to invest when in fact he does want to invest. Due to these costs, males and females have developed separate psychological mechanisms where males over-perceive female desire for sex and females under-perceive male commitment. However, males accurately perceive female commitment and females accurately perceive male sexual interests.

Mate retention 

In addition to acquiring and attracting mates, humans need to retain their mate over a certain period of time. This is especially important in long-term, pair-bonded relationships. It has been hypothesized that feelings of love have evolved to keep humans in their mating relationship. It has been shown that feelings of love motivate individuals to pursue their current partner and stray away from alternatives. Additionally, proclaiming feelings of love increases the attachment and commitment to the current partner. Further, when proclaiming recalling love and commitment, oxytocin, a hormone associated with pair-bonding activities, increases in the bloodstream. This links physiological indicators with mate retention behaviors.

Despite this link, maintaining a pair-bonded relationship can be difficult, especially around alternative mates. When presented with alternative mates with a high mate value, humans tend to view their current relationship less favorably. This occurs when males are presented with physically attractive females, and it occurs for females when they are presented with socially dominant males. However, there are psychological counter-measures to these processes. First, individuals in a committed relationship tend to devalue alternative mate options, thus finding them less attractive. Second, these individuals don't always consider potential alternatives. Instead they pay less attention to alternative mates and therefore don't undergo the devaluation process. These mechanisms tend to happen unconsciously and help the individual maintain their current relationship.

There are several strategies that an individual can do to retain their mate. First off, individuals should engage in more mate retention strategies when their mate is of high value. Therefore, males with more physically attractive mates and females with mates that have more resources engage in more mate retention behaviors. Additionally, to retain their mates, males undertake resource displays and females enhance their physical appearance. Finally, jealousy helps maintain relationships. Jealousy is associated with the threat of mate loss and helps individuals engage in behaviors to keep their current mate. However, males and females differ on what cues jealousy. Since males have issues confirming parental certainty, they become more jealous than females for sexual cheating. However, historically females needed male resources for offspring investment. Therefore, females become more jealous over emotional cheating, as it threatens the devotion of resources to her and her offspring.

Intrasexual competition 

For both sexes, high social status and ample access to resources are important for evolutionary success. But each sex has its own strategies for competing against members of the same sex. To safeguard their genetic interests, girls and women tend to form alliances with kin, affines (in-laws), and a few select female friends. Instead of direct competition, females tend to disguise their efforts to outclass their competitors in order to avoid physical harm and violence unless they are already of high status, in which case they can rely on greater protection and greater access to resources. Other strategies include enforcing equality within a social clique in order to minimize competition and excluding other females—that is, potential competitors—from one's social circles.

Individual differences

Sociosexual Orientation Inventory 
Just as there are differences between the sexes in mating strategies, there are differences within the sexes and such within-sex variation is substantial. Individual differences in mating strategies are commonly measured using the Sociosexual Orientation Inventory (SOI), a questionnaire that includes items assessing past sexual behavior, anticipated future sexual behavior, and openness to casual sex. Higher scores on the SOI indicate a sexually unrestricted mating strategy, which indicates an openness to casual sex and more partners. Conversely, lower scores on the SOI indicate a sexually restricted mating strategy, which a focus on higher commitment and fewer partners.

Several studies have found that scores on the SOI are related to mate preferences, with more sexually restricted individuals preferring personal/parenting qualities in a mate (e.g. responsibility and loyalty), and with less sexual restricted individual preferring qualities related to physical attractiveness and social visibility. Other studies have shown that SOI scores are related to personality traits (i.e. extraversion, erotophilia, and low agreeableness), conspicuous consumption in men as a means to attract women, and increased allocation of visual attention to attractive opposite-sex faces.

Short-term vs. long-term mating 
Evolutionary psychologists have proposed that individuals adopt conditional mating strategies in which they adjust their mating tactics to relevant environmental or internal conditions, which is called strategic pluralism. The concept of sexual pluralism states that humans do not pursue the same mating strategy all of the time. There are different motivations and environmental influences that determine the mating strategy which a person will adopt. The long-term and short-term mating behaviors are triggered in the individual by the current strategy being pursued. Therefore, not only are there differences between the sexes in long-term and short-term mating, but there are also differences within the sexes. To the extent that ancestral men were capable of pursuing short-term mating strategies with multiple women, they tend to do so. However, not every male is able to pursue this option. Additionally, even though most women pursue a long term mating strategy, some females pursue a short-term strategy.

Differences among males 
When possible, males will typically pursue a short-term mating strategy. The ability to do this depends upon their mate value, so males with a high mate value are more likely to pursue a short-term mating strategy. High mate value males have been shown to have sexual intercourse earlier and more often than low mate value males. Self-esteem and physical attractiveness have been shown to be related to male pursuing a short term mating strategy. Additionally, males with more testosterone have been shown to pursue more short-term strategies.

However, not all males pursue a short-term mating strategy. There are several reasons for this. First, long-term mating has its own advantages that have already been discussed. Second, while males of higher mate value and status have opportunities to pursue short-term mates, low mate value males typically do not have the same opportunities. Since females generally prefer long-term mating strategies, the few who would mate in the short-term are already paired with the high mate value males. Additionally, the benefits of short-term mating for females are only obtained through high mate value males. Therefore, low status males are more likely to pursue long-term mating strategy.

Differences among females 
While more attractive males tend to pursue a short-term mating strategy, more attractive females tend to pursue a more long-term mating strategy. Additionally, younger females are more likely to pursue a short-term mating strategy, as well as those who are not satisfied with their current partner.

The ovulatory cycle has been shown to influence a female's mating strategy. In the late follicular phase, women are the most fertile in the ovulatory cycle. During this time, there is evidence that females tend to pursue a short-term oriented mating strategy over a long-term one. Additionally, female sexual desires increase as well as their attraction towards more masculine males.

Additionally, female mating strategies can change across their lifetime. In their early thirties, females experience a peak in sexual desire. In turn, this increase influences females to pursue a more long or short term oriented strategy depending on the mate value of their current partner.

Mating plasticity 
Research on the conditional nature of mating strategies has revealed that long-term and short-term mating preferences can be fairly plastic. Following exposure to cues that would have been affected mating in the ancestral past, both men and women appear to adjust their mating preferences in ways that would have historically enhanced their fitness. Such cues include the need to care for young, danger from animals and other humans, and resource availability. Additionally, there is evidence that the female sex drive is more plastic than male sex drive, because they are the selecting sex. Since females typically chose when and with whom to engage in sex, this sex drive plasticity could be an effect of female mate choice.

Environmental predictors

Culture 

Evolutionary psychologists have investigated different strategies and environmental influences across different cultures and confirmed that men tend to report a greater preference for youth and physical attractiveness in a mate than do women. Additionally, women tend to report a greater preference for ambition and social status in a mate than do men. The specific role that culture plays in modulating sex differences in mate preferences is subject to debate. Cultural variations in mate preference can be due to the evolved differences between males and females in a given culture.

Culture also has a link to mating strategies in the form of marriage systems in the society. Specifically, pathogens have been linked to whether a society is more likely to have polygynous or monogamous marriage systems. Cultures with high pathogen stress are more likely to have polygynous marriage systems, especially exogamous polygamy systems. This is helpful for both males and females, as males obtain greater genetic diversity for their offspring and females have access to healthy males, which are typically lacking in high pathogen societies. Conversely, monogamy is often absent from high pathogen environments, but common in low pathogen environments.

Further, since physical attractiveness is thought to signal health and disease resistance, evolutionary psychologists have predicted that, in societies high in pathogen prevalence, people value attractiveness more in a mate. Indeed, research has confirmed that pathogen prevalence is associated with preferences for attractiveness across nations. Women in nations with high pathogen prevalence also show greater preferences for facial masculinity. Researchers have also reasoned that sexual contact with multiple individuals increases the risk of disease transmission, thereby increasing the costs of pursuing a short-term mating strategy. Consistent with this reasoning, higher pathogen prevalence is associated with lower national SOI scores. Finally, several studies have found that experimentally manipulating disease salience has a causal influence on attractiveness preferences and SOI scores in predicted directions.

Sex ratio 

The local operational sex ratio has been shown to have an impact on mating strategies. This is defined as the ratio of marriage-age males to marriage-age females, with a high ratio representing more males and a low ratio representing more females in the local area. When there is an imbalance of sexes, the rare sex typically has more choice, while the plentiful sex has to compete more strategically for the rare sex. This leads to the plentiful sex competing on specific areas that the rare sex finds attractive. Additionally, the plentiful sex will adopt more of the rare sex's mating strategy. In a population with a low sex ratio, females will adopt a more short-term mating strategy and will compete more intensely on things like physical attractiveness. On the other hand, in a society with a high sex ratio, males will adopt a more long-term strategy to attractive females. For example, in the major metropolitan areas of China, females are generally in short supply and as such are more likely to be fulfilled should they find a mate while many men are simply left out of the dating market. On the other hand, on the Island of Manhattan and in several Western university campuses, females are in excess and as such they compete intensely for male attention, giving rise to hookup culture and short-term mating websites such as Tinder.

In 2005, the evolutionary psychologist David Schmitt conducted a multinational survey of sexual attitudes and behaviors involving 48 countries called the International Sexual Description Project (ISSR). Schmitt assessed relationships between several societal-level variables and average scores on the SOI. One variable that was shown to significantly predict a nation's average SOI score was the Operational Sex Ratio (OSR).  This prediction was confirmed; OSR was significantly positively correlated with national SOI scores. Another variable that Schmitt predicted would influence SOI scores was the need for biparental care. In societies where extensive care from both parents is needed to ensure offspring survival, the costs of having sex with an uncommitted partner are much higher. Schmitt found significant negative correlations between several indices of need for biparental care (e.g. infant mortality, child malnutrition, and low birth-weight infants) and national SOI scores.

Income and education 
Some sex differences in mate preferences may be attenuated by national levels of gender equity and gender empowerment. For example, as women gain more access to resources their mate preferences change. Finding a mate with resources becomes less of a priority and a mate with domestic skills is more important. As women's access to resources varies between cultures, so does mate preference. In light of these findings, it has been suggested that both female physical attractiveness and male access to resources can be thought of as "necessities" in a mate. Other qualities, such as humor, are thought of as "luxuries." Therefore, humans first look for the necessities in a mate. After they have obtained the specific necessities, individuals can then place value on the luxury qualities. This helps to explain some of the debate of the role of resources and attractiveness in mate value.

During times of economic distress, women would be highly reluctant to commit to low-status men in long-term relationships and men would be delaying marriage, if they ever get married at all, in order to accumulate enough resources to attract attention. Consequently, both marriage and birth rates would drop. In addition, because the number of children a woman can have over her lifetime is much smaller than that of a man, under harsh economic realities women tend to sacrifice their careers in favor of domestic duties in order to safeguard their genetic interests. Traditional gender roles would be reinforced as a result.

Impact of and on culture

Adolescent behavior 

From the neurological perspective, the well-known tendencies of teenagers to be emotional, impulsive, and to take high risks are due to the fact that the limbic system (responsible for emotional thought) is developing faster than the prefrontal cortex (logical reasoning). From the evolutionary viewpoint, this mismatch is adaptive in that it helps young people connect with other people (by being emotional) and learn to negotiate the complexities of life (by taking risks yet being more sensitive to rewards). As a result, teenagers are more prone to feelings of fear, anxiety, and depression than adults. In order to attract potential mates, males are especially prone to take risks and showcase their athleticism whereas females tend to direct attention to their beauty. Young males (who have the highest reproductive variance) take more risks than any other group in both experiments and observations. By undertaking risky endeavors, males are thought to signal the qualities which may be directly related to one’s ability to provision and protect one’s family, namely, physical skill, good judgment, or bravery. Social dominance, confidence, and ambition could help in competition among other males, while social dominance, ambition, and wealth might alleviate the costs of failure. In addition, traits like bravery and physical prowess may also be valued by cooperative partners due to their benefits in group-hunting and warfare, thereby increasing the potential audience for risk takers. The tendency of adolescent and young-adult males to engage in risky and aggressive behaviors is known as the 'young male syndrome'. His self-worth is tied to being perceived as a 'real man'. His likelihood of committing or falling victim to a violent crime peaks between his late teens and late twenties. Young females, on the other hand, are under strong peer pressure to be physically attractive, potentially leading to problems with their body image. A teenage girl or young woman's bond with her first sexual partner is often deep. In both sexes, intense adolescent intrasexual competition, amorous infatuations, and sexual experimentation are common.

Psychological research indicates the existence of a "reminiscence bump" between the ages of 10 and 30, a period important in human development, when people receive a substantial amount of feedback on their social status and reproductive desirability. Due to sex differences in mating strategies, it is more difficult for a female to alter the course of her reproductive career than it is more a male. In fact, females not only mature more quickly but also were historically more likely than males to marry and bear their first children before the age of 20 than males. As a consequence, by late adolescence, it is, from the perspective of evolution, crucial that a girl finds herself a high-quality mate.

Whereas ancestral humans lived in small bands of related people of all ages, modern secondary school students are share the same social environment as people from the same age groups from diverse backgrounds, an evolutionary novelty. Back then, social competition during adolescence proved crucial to future social and reproductive success, hence the strong desire to be popular. Today, it is possible for people to relocate to a different place or transfer to another school. Still, the curiosity about how the lives of others for the sake of comparison remains. Teenagers are also quite conformist with regards to their peers, for under ancestral condition, social ostracism was generally deadly. In 21st-century society, youths who rebel against the dominant culture or figures of authority tend become more homogeneous with respect to their own subculture, making their behavior the opposite to any claims of counterculture. This synchronization occurs even if more than two choices are available, such as multiple styles of beard rather than whether or not to have a beard. Mathematician Jonathan Touboul who studies how information propagation through society affects human behavior calls this the hipster effect.

Consumer psychology 
According to psychologist Gad Saad, consumer behavior can only be truly understood in light of evolutionary psychology because consumer behavior "is rooted in a shared biological heritage based around four key Darwinian factors: survival, reproduction, kin selection, and reciprocal altruism."

One way to signal one's socioeconomic status is conspicuous consumption, or when individuals purchase luxurious items which provide little to no utility over less costly versions, thereby prioritizing self-promotion over economic sense. It is a common behavior of class and often involves strategic planning to maximize the audience of the display and the strength of the signal. Most signaling explanations of conspicuous consumption predict the targets of the signal will predominately be potential mates. Among males, the information signaled is thought to go beyond genetic quality and signal the potential for investment, which can be attractive to those seeking both long-term and short-term mating strategies. Among females, a suggested to benefit from conspicuous consumption in mating contexts is its hypothesized ability to demonstrate the commitment of one’s partner and signal one’s mate quality to rivals, both of which may help in intrasexual competition and deter mate poaching. Conspicuous consumption may also be useful for problems outside of acquiring mates. This can involve attempts at attracting other cooperative partners, who stand to gain from the signalers ability to confer benefits should they form an alliance. As in mating contexts, there may also be benefits to intimidating rivals, thereby decreasing the likelihood of direct competition for resources in the future.  Its prevalence across cultures and social classes suggests that humans may be well suited to balancing the costs and benefits of the signal.

The notion that "sex sells" is now commonly accepted and utilized by advertisers. Nevertheless, some cultures (such as France) are more receptive to sex in advertising than others (such as South Korea).

Sensational journalism and gossip 
Despite common objections, sensational news stories continue to attract a large audience. A 2003 analysis of 736 stories from 1700 to 2001 by Hank Davis and S. Lyndsay McLeod reveals that these stories could be categorized according themes with reproductive value, such as cheater detection and treatment of offspring. Davis and McLeod propose that sensational journalism serves the same purpose as gossip. Gossip is the sharing of both positive and negative information about a third person who may or may not be absent from the group, and as such is useful for acquiring potentially useful information about the social structure, rivals, as well as allies. It may also be used for the purposes of intrasexual competition, or the denigration of rivals in order to elevate oneself, with men gossiping about access to resources (wealth and achievement) and women about looks and reputations. However, women appear to be more likely to gossip than men and to think of it positively than men. Furthermore, much gossip concerns social affairs. According to Frank T. McAndrew, the same psychological reasons that underlie more traditional forms gossip carry over to gossip about "celebrities" in the modern world because, on the evolutionary timescale, the birth of celebrity culture is a recent phenomenon.

Romance novels, fan fiction, and pornography 
As defined by the Romance Writers of America, a romance novel features "a central love story and an emotionally satisfying and optimistic ending." Many also carry erotic undertones. Indeed, evolutionary psychologists have gained valuable insights into women's mate choice by studying romance novels popular among women, such as those sold by Harlequin. Popular contemporary female romance novels conform to strategies common among women, for example by avoiding short-term relationships, and as such pertain to their genetic interests. Five of the most common words in such novels are, in order of most to least frequent, 'love', 'bride', 'baby', 'man', and 'marriage' and the most common themes are commitment, reproduction, high-value—i.e. masculine—males, and resources. Romance novels sell rather well, with around 10,000 new titles appearing each year in the U.S. alone.

Fan fiction is the online equivalent of romance novels. During the first two decades of the 21st century, writing and reading fan fiction became a prevalent activity worldwide. Demographic data from various depositories revealed that those who read and wrote fan fiction were overwhelmingly young, in their teens and twenties, and female. For example, an analysis of the site fanfiction.net published in 2019 by data scientists Cecilia Aragon and Katie Davis showed that some 60 billion words of contents were added during the previous 20 years by 10 million English-speaking people whose median age was 15½ years. Much of fan fiction concerns the romantic pairing of fictional characters of interest, or 'shipping'. Fan fiction writers base their work on various internationally popular cultural phenomena such as K-pop, Star Trek, Harry Potter, Doctor Who, and My Little Pony, known as 'canon', as well as other things they considered important to their lives, like natural disasters. Socially dominant men—the so-called "alpha males"—are the most popular among women.

Males, by contrast, are generally more interested in pornography because it carries the same cues to female fertility they look for under mating conditions. Online pornography is now ubiquitous and popularly consumed. In their book A Billion Wicked Thoughts (2011) analyzing search-engine results, cognitive scientists Ogi Ogas and Sai Gaddam wrote, "Men’s brains are designed to objectify females. The shapely curves of female ornamentation indicate how many years of healthy childbearing remain across a woman’s entire lifetime." By letting her test subject watch erotic materials of various kinds—straight sex, gay sex, and bonobos—sexologist Meredith Chivers discovered an excellent agreement between the self-reported arousal of men and the amount of blood flow to their genitals. Men were only aroused by videos of straight sex. On the other hand, Chivers found a clear mismatch between the self-reports of women and what her devices measured. While women seemed easily aroused by videos of all three categories, increased blood flow alone was not enough to induce arousal. This seems to correspond with the different mating behaviors of men and women.

Music, film, and television 

A 2011 study by Dawn R. Hobbs and Gordon G. Gallup of songs dating back over four centuries show that reproductive messaging has been a common theme among the most popular of songs. Hobbs and Gallup observe that their "content analysis of these messages revealed 18 reproductive themes that read like topics taken from an outline for a course on evolutionary psychology." An overwhelming majority (about 92%) of the songs that made it to the Billboard Top 10 in 2009 contained reproductive messages. In fact, "further analyses showed that the bestselling songs in all three charts featured significantly more reproductive messages than those that failed to make it into the Top Ten." Among contemporary English-language songs, country music tends to focus on commitment, parenting, and rejection; pop music on sex appeal, reputation, short-term strategies, and fidelity assurance; and rhythms and blues (R&B) and hip hop on sex appeal, resources, sex act, and status.

Hobbs and Gallup classified the reproductive massaging of the songs into 18 categories, including genitalia (e.g. "Baby Got Back" (1992) by Sir Mix-A-Lot), courtship displays and long-term mating ("I Wanna Hold Your Hand" (1963) by The Beatles), short-term mating ("LoveGame" (2009) by Lady Gaga), foreplay and arousal ("Sugar, Sugar" (1969) by The Archies), sex act ("Honky Tonk Women" (1969) by the Rolling Stones), sexual prowess ("Sixty Minute Man" (1951) by Billy Ward and the Dominoes), promiscuity, reputation, and derogation ("Roxanne" (1978) by the Police), commitment and fidelity ("Love Story" (2008) by Taylor Swift), access to resources ("For the Love of Money" (1973) by the O'Jays), rejection ("Red Light" (2009) by David Nail), infidelity, cheater detection, and mate poaching ("I Heard It Through the Grapevine" (1966) by Marvin Gaye), and parenting ("It Won't Be Like This For Long" (2008) by Darius Rucker).

Nevertheless, the evolutionary purpose of music, if such exists, remains unclear. Some researchers like Charles Darwin and Geoffrey Miller propose that it is a form of courtship that has evolved by means of sexual selection whereas others, such as Steven Pinker and Gary Markus, reject it as "auditory cheesecake"—no more than a purely cultural invention that is a by-product of evolved traits such as cognition and language.

A similar pattern is found in popular movies, where themes of survival (fighting epic battles), reproduction (courtship), kin selection (treatment of family members), and altruism (saving a stranger's life) are ubiquitous. Indeed, as in the case with novels or mythology, the number of basic plots is rather small.

Online dating 
Online dating services offer goldmines of information for social scientists studying human mating behavior. Nevertheless, as of 2017, no new pattern has been identified; to the contrary, scientists have only found the strengthening of gender stereotypes, namely the attention to a prospective mate's socioeconomic status among women, the preference for youth and beauty among men, and the deliberate self-misrepresentation among both sexes.

Politics and religions 
In general, the emotion of disgust can be divided into three categories: pathogen disgust, sexual disgust, and moral disgust. Sexual disgust leads to the avoidance of individuals and behaviors that jeopardizes one's long-term mating success. Moral disgust is being repelled by socially abnormal behaviors.

Some evolutionary psychologists have argued that mating strategies can influence political attitudes. According to this perspective, different mating strategies are in direct strategic conflict. For instance, the stability of long-term partnerships may be threatened by the availability of short-term sexual opportunities. Therefore, public policy measures that impose costs on casual sex may benefit people pursuing long-term mating strategies by reducing the availability of short-term mating opportunities outside of committed relationships. One public policy measure that imposes costs on people pursuing short-term mating strategies, and may thereby appeal to sexually restricted individuals, is the banning of abortion. In a doctoral dissertation, the psychologist Jason Weeden conducted statistical analyses on public and undergraduate datasets supporting the hypothesis that attitudes towards abortion are more strongly predicted by mating-relevant variables than by variables related to views on the sanctity of life.

Weeden and colleagues have also argued that attitudes towards drug legalization are driven by individual differences in mating strategies. Insofar as sexually restricted individuals associate recreational drug use with promiscuity, they may be motivated to oppose drug legalization. Consistent with this, one study found that the strongest predictor of attitudes towards drug legalization was scores on the SOI. This relationship remained strong even when controlling for personality traits, political orientation, and moral values. By contrast, nonsexual variables typically associated with attitudes towards drug legalization were strongly attenuated or eliminated when controlling for SOI and other sexuality-related measures. These findings were replicated in Belgium, Japan, and the Netherlands.

Weeden and colleagues have made similar arguments and have conducted similar analyses in regard to religiosity; that is, religious institutions may function to facilitate high-fertility, monogamous mating and reproductive strategies.

See also 

 Recent human evolution
 Parental investment in humans
 Sociosexuality
 Online dating service
 Alternative mating strategy
 Optimal stopping and the secretary problem
 Costly signaling in evolutionary psychology

References

External links
 Victorian mate choice by evolutionary psychologist Geoffrey Miller (8:46). Transcript.

Evolutionary psychology
Mating
Sexology
Sexuality